Natasha Ali is a Pakistani actress, model and host. She is known for her roles in Talafi, Khaas, Mushk and Malaal-e-Yaar.

Biography and career
She was born on January 1, 1988, in Lahore, Pakistan. She completed her studies from University of Lahore. She made her debut in 2001 on PTV. She played a small supporting actress in drama Miss Fit On PTV. Then she did lead roles for several dramas on PTV Channel which made her noted by the audience. She played an important lead role in Talafi drama as Sharmeen on PTV which was a great success, she was praised for playing a villainess role and got popular. She was also host on many morning shows such as Channel 92. In 2013 she was very well known by the audience and appeared in several dramas, she was praised for her acting and was recognized for her acting skills and for playing different characters. In 2019-2020, she played some different roles in some dramas such as Khaas, Mushk, Malaal-e-Yaar and Resham Gali Ki Husna.

Personal life
In 2020 Natasha married civil engineer Shahzeb Ali in August 14.

Filmography

Television

Film

References

External links
 

1988 births
Living people
Pakistani television actresses
21st-century Pakistani actresses
Pakistani film actresses